Thomas Gordon was a Scottish writer and Commonwealthman. Along with John Trenchard, he published The Independent Whig, which was a weekly periodical. From 1720 to 1723, Trenchard and Gordon wrote a series of 144 essays entitled Cato's Letters, condemning corruption and lack of morality within the British political system and warning against tyranny. The essays were published as Essays on Liberty, Civil and Religious, at first in the London Journal and then in the British Journal. These essays became a cornerstone of the Commonwealth man tradition and were influential in shaping the ideas of the Country Party. His ideas played an important role in shaping republicanism in Britain and especially in the American colonies leading up to the American Revolution.  Zuckert argues, "The writers who, more than any others, put together the new synthesis that is the new republicanism were John Trenchard and Thomas Gordon, writing in the early eighteenth century as Cato."

Life

He was born in Kirkcudbright towards the end of the seventeenth century. He possibly attended the University of Aberdeen.

He went to London as a young man and taught languages. Two pamphlets on the Bangorian controversy commended him to John Trenchard, a Whig politician; one was probably A Letter to the Lord Archbishop (i.e. William Wake) in 1719, who had written a Latin letter reflecting upon Hoadly, addressed to the church of Zurich. Gordon became Trenchard's amanuensis.

Robert Walpole made Gordon first commissioner of the wine licenses, a post which he held till his death on 28 July 1750. Gordon was twice married, his second wife being Trenchard's widow.

Works
A tract called the Independent Whig, published at the time of the rejection of the Peerage Bill (December 1719), was followed by a second part in January 1720, on the peace with Spain and the value of Gibraltar to England, several editions of which were issued. A weekly paper of the same name was then started, and carried on through the year, the articles by Trenchard, Gordon, and a third contributor, 'C.' [Anthony Collins], being distinguished in the fifth edition. It was first collected in one volume in 1721. To the fifth edition (1732) were appended 'The Craftsman,' a sermon, in the style of Daniel Burgess, also published separately, a letter to a 'Gentleman of Edinburgh,' and an epitaph on Trenchard. In a sixth edition (1735) there was added a third volume containing Gordon's letter to William Wake of 1719 and other tracts; a seventh edition appeared in 1743, and a fourth volume was added in 1747 containing tracts written during the Jacobite Rebellion of 1745. The book was mainly an attack on the High Church party, and on the title-page of later editions is called 'A Defence of Primitive Christianity … against the exorbitant claims of fanatical and disaffected clergymen.' Thomas Wilson, bishop of Sodor and Man, tried to exclude it from his diocese, and got into trouble in consequence. It was translated into French by the Baron d'Holbach.

In 1720 Gordon and Trenchard began the publication of Cato's Letters. They appeared in the London Journal and then in the British Journal until Trenchard's death in 1723, and were reprinted in 4 vols. in 1724.

Gordon published, by subscription, a translation of Tacitus, in 2 vols. 1728 (dedications to the Prince of Wales and Walpole), which went through several editions, and seems to have been the standard translation till the end of the century. Edward Gibbon read it in his youth (Misc. Works, i. 41). John Nichols claimed that Gordon's commentaries on Tacitus were derivative from the work of Virgilio Malvezzi, Scipione Ammirato and Baltasar Alamos de Barrientos. In 1744 he published The Works of Sallust, with Political Discourses upon that author; to which is added a translation of Cicero's "Four Orations against Cateline." He published an 'Essay on Government' in 1747, and a 'Collection of Papers' by him appeared in 1748.

Gordon also wrote a preface to a translation from Barbeyrac called 'The Spirit of Ecclesiastics in all Ages,' 1722.

The unfinished draft of a History of England is now preserved in the British Library Manuscript Collections.

Notes

References
Hunt, F. Knight. The Fourth State: A History of Newspapers and of the liberty of the press vol.I. Londres: David Borgue, 1850.

External links
 
 
 
 

1691 births
1750 deaths
17th-century Scottish people
People from Kirkcudbright
Scottish political writers
Whig (British political party) politicians
Scottish publishers (people)
Scottish essayists
Scottish linguists
Scottish republicans
Amanuenses